William Hines Furbush (1839 - September 3, 1902) was a photographer, state legislator, sheriff, lawyer, and newspaper editor in Arkansas. In February 1865, towards the end of the American Civil War, he joined the 42nd Ohio Infantry Regiment in Columbus, Ohio. He became a commissary sergeant and was discharged in January 1866. He lived in Liberia for a short time after the war and returned to the United States.

He was born in Carroll County, Kentucky. He studied in Ohio before returning to Arkansas.

A Republican he served in the Arkansas Legislature. He advocated for the creation of Lee County, Arkansas (named for Confederate Army leader (Robert E. Lee) and was appointed its first sheriff. He eventually switched to the Democratic Party. He moved to Colorado and Ohio before returning to Arkansas.

See also
African-American officeholders during and following the Reconstruction era

References

1839 births
1902 deaths
Union Army non-commissioned officers
Members of the Arkansas House of Representatives
People from Kentucky
People from Lee County, Arkansas
Arkansas Republicans
Arkansas Democrats
African-American politicians during the Reconstruction Era
American emigrants to Liberia
20th-century African-American people